Rincón de la Victoria is a municipality in the province of Málaga in the autonomous community of Andalusia in southern Spain.  It is the municipality with the highest well-being in the province of Malaga, according to the Synthetic Indicator of Economic Welfare developed by Andalusian Analysts. According to the same study, Rincón de la Victoria has the highest income per capita in Andalucia.

History
Archaeological findings at the Cueva del Tesoro testify the human presence as early as the Palaeolithic Age. There are remains of walls from around 1000 BC which perhaps included an Iberian settlement.

Around 50 BC the Carthaginians established a port in a harbour nearby, followed by the Romans, who built here a fortified village called Bezmiliana. The presence of  a Greek colony is unconfirmed. Under the Moors it became a larger city, described by the 11th century traveller al-Idrisi.

After the conquest of the area under the Catholic Monarchs, the town experienced a period of decline which lasted until the 18th century.

Main sights
Castle (18th century)
 Archaeological area of Loma-Torre de Benagalbón, including a Roman villa
 Archaeological Park of the Mediterranean 
Archaeological remains of Bezmiliana
Cueva del Tesoro ("Grotto of the Treasure")
Museum of Arts and Traditions
Museum of Maritime Arts

References

External links
Official website
Rincón de la Victoria - Sistema de Información Multiterritorial de Andalucía
Pharmacies on Rincón de la Victoria

Municipalities in the Province of Málaga